The 2022–23 UC Riverside Highlanders men's basketball team represents the University of California, Riverside in the 2022–23 NCAA Division I men's basketball season. The Highlanders, led by third-year head coach Mike Magpayo, play their home games at SRC Arena in Riverside, California as members of the Big West Conference.

Previous season
The Highlanders finished the 2021–22 season 16–12, 9–6 in Big West play to finish in sixth place. They were defeated by Hawaii in the first round of the Big West tournament.

Roster

Schedule and results

|-
!colspan=12 style=| Exhibition

|-
!colspan=12 style=| Non-conference regular season

|-
!colspan=12 style=| Big West regular season

|-
!colspan=12 style=| Big West tournament

Sources

References

UC Riverside Highlanders men's basketball seasons
UC Riverside Highlanders
UC Riverside Highlanders men's basketball
UC Riverside Highlanders men's basketball